The 1971 Ugandan coup d'état was a military coup d'état executed by the Ugandan military, led by general Idi Amin, against the government of President Milton Obote on 25 January 1971. The seizure of power took place while Obote was abroad attending the Commonwealth Heads of Government Meeting in Singapore. Amin was afraid that Obote might dismiss him, and installed himself as dictator.

The 1971 coup is often cited as an example of "class action by the military", wherein the Uganda Army acted against "an increasingly socialist regime whose egalitarian domestic politics posed more and more of a threat to the military's economic privileges".

Background

A rift had developed between Amin and Obote, exacerbated by the support Amin had built within the army by recruiting from the West Nile region, his involvement in operations to support the rebellion in southern Sudan and an attempt on Obote's life in 1969. In October 1970, Obote took overall control of the armed forces, reducing Amin from his position of commander in chief of all the armed forces to that of commander in chief of the army.

The Obote government pursued a policy of African nationalism, which antagonized the British and the Israeli governments—both of which maintained a strong presence in Uganda. Obote supported various independence movements in Southern Africa and opposed British weapons sales to the Apartheid South African government, attending the Commonwealth Heads of Government Meeting 1971 in order to address this issue. The British government was also opposed to Obote's Move to the Left, a series of socialist-orientated policies that hindered the operations of international corporations; in addition, the British government feared that these initiatives would provoke the departure of the Asian community in Uganda, who were British subjects and would likely emigrate the United Kingdom, a possibility the UK government was unprepared for.

Israel initially maintained close relations with Obote's government, and used Uganda as a means to channel support to Anyanya rebels in southern Sudan with the hope of distracting Sudan from supporting Palestine in the Arab–Israeli conflict. In 1969 Jaafar Nimeiry came to power in Sudan via a coup and pledged to end the war in the country. Obote summarily ordered the end of all aid to the Anyanya, troubling the Israeli government.

Coup
Having learned that Obote was planning to arrest him for misappropriating army funds, Amin launched a coup on 25 January 1971, while Obote was attending a Commonwealth summit meeting in Singapore. Army and military police forces loyal to Amin moved to secure strategic positions in and around Kampala and Entebbe. The putschists sealed off Entebbe International Airport to prevent Obote's return, and tanks and soldiers patrolled the streets of Kampala and Entebbe. Here, some soldiers loyal to President Obote and members of the General Service Unit resisted the coup forces while some fighting also took place at the Kampala police college. Obote's residence was surrounded and major roads were blocked. A nighttime curfew was imposed by the coup forces. Overall, the Obote loyalists were too disorganized to offer an effective resistance, and they were quickly overwhelmed. At 4:30pm it was announced that the Army and the police under Amin's leadership had control of the entire country.

Some historians have written that the British government may have been involved in orchestrating the coup. Obote was a supporter of independence movements in Southern Africa and chose to attend the Commonwealth Heads of Government Meeting 1971 to oppose British weapons sales to the Apartheid South African government. The decision was taken at the meeting to allow the British government to proceed with the arms sale, but the issue threatened to split apart the Commonwealth.

Uganda radio broadcasts accused the Obote government of corruption and said the army believed Obote's policies result in violence and accused him of giving preferential treatment to certain regions of the country. The broadcast was reportedly met with cheering crowds in the capital. After having seized control of the government, Amin moved to purge the military of political rivals, and ordered the murder of Acholi and Lango soldiers whom he suspected of being supportive of Obote. By 1972, about 5,000 of them had been killed.

Aftermath 
As he consolidated his power as military dictator, Amin ordered numerous purges against suspected opponents, resulting in 30,000 to 50,000 Ugandans killed over the years following the coup. Thousands consequently fled to Tanzania, where they joined Obote's dissidents. With the approval of President of Tanzania Julius Nyerere, these Ugandan exiles formed a small guerilla army, and invaded Uganda in 1972. The popular uprising against Amin they had hoped for failed to materialize, however, and the invasion was defeated. Nevertheless, the conflict resulted in a sharp deterioration of relations between Uganda and Tanzania, which ultimately contributed to the Uganda–Tanzania War and the fall of Amin's regime in 1979.

In popular culture 
 The film Rise and Fall of Idi Amin opens with the coup occurring while Dr. Michael Oloya (Thomas Baptiste) is performing surgery, and is portrayed as violent. Despite the gunfire happening outside, Oloya continues the operation, saying, "This patient will not be his first casualty!" Immediately afterward, Amin (Joseph Olita) is shown in a military parade, cheered on by the Ugandan people. British and French diplomats show their open support for him, stating there is "more than enough socialist nonsense running around the rest of the world."
 In the film Last King of Scotland, the coup is portrayed as popular, with Amin as being "for the people". The coup is supported by the British. Opponents of Amin are described as being "Obote's men".

See also
Uganda under Idi Amin

References

Works cited

Further reading 

Coup
1970s coups d'état and coup attempts
Cold War in Africa
Conflicts in 1971
Idi Amin
January 1971 events in Africa
1971